In ancient Arab mythology, Azizos or Aziz (Palmyrene: 𐡰𐡦𐡩𐡦 ʿzyz) is the Palmyran Arab god of the morning star. He is portrayed as riding a camel with his twin brother Arsu, although one source says that "Azizos is depicted as a horseman, whereas Arşu is a cameleer." He was venerated separately in Syria as god of the morning star, Phosphoros, in company with the astral god Monimos, Hesperos.

Azizos was identified as Ares by Julian in his work 'Hymn to King Helios'.  He says "Now I am aware that Ares, who is called Azizos by the Syrians who inhabit Emesa..."

References

Sources

Encyclopedia of Gods, Michael Jordan, Kyle Cathie Limited, 2002

West Semitic gods
Arabian gods
Stellar gods
Venusian deities
Divine twins